The Blagen Block is an historic building in Portland, Oregon's Old Town Chinatown neighborhood, in the United States.  The four-story building was designed by Warren H. Williams and completed in 1888. In 1970, the city's Historic Landmarks Commission designated the Blagen Block as a Portland Historic Landmark. In 1975, it was listed as a primary landmark in the National Register of Historic Places (NRHP) nomination of the Portland Skidmore/Old Town Historic District, the building's designation subsequently translated to "contributing property" under post-1970s NRHP terminology. Since 2014, Airbnb has had offices in the building, opening its office in December of that year.

References

External links

1888 establishments in Oregon
Buildings and structures completed in 1888
Buildings and structures in Portland, Oregon
Old Town Chinatown
Historic district contributing properties in Oregon
Portland Historic Landmarks
Northwest Portland, Oregon